Bibloplectus ruficeps is a species in the family Staphylinidae ("rove beetles"), in the order Coleoptera ("beetles").
It is found in North America.

References

Further reading
 Arnett, R. H. Jr., M. C. Thomas, P. E. Skelley and J. H. Frank. (eds.). (21 June 2002). American Beetles, Volume II: Polyphaga: Scarabaeoidea through Curculionoidea. CRC Press LLC, Boca Raton, Florida .
 Chandler, Donald S. (1997). "Family: Pselaphidae". A Catalog of the Coleoptera of America North of Mexico, ix + 118.
 Richard E. White. (1983). Peterson Field Guides: Beetles. Houghton Mifflin Company.
 Ross H. Arnett. (2000). American Insects: A Handbook of the Insects of America North of Mexico. CRC Press.

Pselaphinae
Beetles described in 1856